Beringin Airport  was an airport in Muara Teweh, the capital city of the North Barito Regency in Central Kalimantan, Indonesia. The airport was closed at 10 September 2020.

References

External links 
Beringin Airport - Indonesia Airport Global Website

Airports in Central Kalimantan